Cynomops is a genus of Central and South American dog-faced bats in the family Molossidae. It has sometimes been considered a subgenus of Molossops. It contains the following species:

 Cinnamon dog-faced bat (C. abrasus)
 Freeman's dog-faced bat (C. freemani)
 Greenhall's dog-faced bat (C. greenhalli)
 Cynomops kuizha
 Cynomops mastivus (C. mastivus)
 Mexican dog-faced bat (C. mexicanus)
 Miller’s dog-faced bat (C. milleri)
 Para dog-faced bat (C. paranus)
 Southern dog-faced bat (C. planirostris)
 Waorani dog-faced bat (C. tonkigui)

Phylogeny

References

 
Bat genera
Taxa named by Oldfield Thomas